The Ministry of Agriculture of the Czech Republic is a government ministry.

External links
 

Czech Republic
Agriculture
Agricultural organizations based in the Czech Republic